Dummy, the Witch of Sible Hedingham ( – 4 September 1863) was the pseudonym of an unidentified elderly man who was one of the last people to be accused of witchcraft in England in the 19th century. He died after being beaten and thrown into a river by witch-hunters.

A longtime resident of Sible Hedingham, Essex, a small farming village in the English countryside, he was a deaf-mute who earned a living as a local fortune teller. In September 1863, Dummy was accused by Emma Smith from Ridgewell of 'cursing' her with a disease, and dragged from The Swan tavern by a drunken mob. He was ordered to 'lift the curse'. When Dummy didn't, he was thrown into a nearby brook as an "ordeal by water". He was also severely beaten with sticks before eventually being taken to a workhouse in Halstead where he died of pneumonia. Following an investigation by authorities, Emma Smith and Samuel Stammers, who was a master carpenter and also friends with Smith, were charged with having "unlawfully assaulted an old Frenchman commonly called Dummy, thereby causing his death." (The idea that Dummy was French was common in the village, but there seemed to be little evidence of whether it was true.) They were tried at the Chelmsford Assizes, where on 8 March 1864 they were sentenced to six months' hard labour.

See also
Krystyna Ceynowa
Anna Klemens
Witch trials in the early modern period

References

Foxearth & District Local History Society – The Hedingham Witchcraft Case

Further reading
Gordon Ridgewell, "Swimming a Witch, 1863", Folklore Society News 25 (1997): 15–16.
Davies, Owen. Witchcraft, Magic and Culture, 1736–1951. Manchester: Manchester University Press, 1999. 
Hutton, Ronald. The Triumph of the Moon: A History of Modern Pagan Witchcraft. Oxford: Oxford University Press, 2001. 
Pickering, David. Cassell's Dictionary of Witchcraft. New York: Sterling Publishing Company, 2002. 
Summers, Montague. Geography of Witchcraft. Kessinger Publishing, 2003. 

1788 births
1863 deaths
British murder victims
English deaf people
Deaths by beating in the United Kingdom
Deaths from pneumonia in England
Fortune tellers
Mute people
People from Sible Hedingham
Witchcraft in England
Lynching deaths
1863 murders in the United Kingdom